Julian Bennett may refer to:

Julian Bennett (footballer) (born 1984), English footballer
Julian Bennett (archaeologist), British archaeologist
 Julian Bennett (politician) (1929–2013), Democratic politician and a member of the Florida House of Representatives